The 84th Regiment Illinois Volunteer Infantry was an infantry regiment that served in the Union Army during the American Civil War.

Service
The 84th Illinois Infantry was organized at Quincy, Illinois and mustered into Federal service on September 1, 1862.

The regiment was mustered out on June 8, 1865, in Nashville, Tennessee and discharged on  June 16, 1865.

Total strength and casualties
The regiment suffered four officers and 120 enlisted men who were killed in action or who died of their wounds and 1 officers and 144 enlisted men who died of disease, for a total of 269 fatalities.

Commanders
 Colonel Lewis Henry Waters - Mustered out with the regiment.

See also
List of Illinois Civil War Units
Illinois in the American Civil War

References
The Civil War Archive

Units and formations of the Union Army from Illinois
1862 establishments in Illinois
Military units and formations established in 1862
Military units and formations disestablished in 1865